Fatmir Bushi (born 27 December 1963 in Tirana) is a former Albanian weightlifter who competed at the 1992 Summer Olympics.

References

External links

Weightlifters at the 1992 Summer Olympics
Olympic weightlifters of Albania
Living people
1963 births
Albanian male weightlifters
Sportspeople from Tirana
20th-century Albanian people